Aram Arutyunov (born 1953) is a Russian mathematician, Professor, Dr.Sc., a professor at the Faculty of Computer Science at the Moscow State University and the Peoples' Friendship University of Russia.

He defended the thesis «Perturbation of optimal control problems and necessary conditions for the extremum of the first and second order» for the degree of Doctor of Physical and Mathematical Sciences (1988). and was awarded the title of Professor (1991). He has authored seven books and 318 scientific articles.

References

Literature

External links
 MSU CMC
 Scientific works of Aram Arutyunov
 Scientific works of Aram Arutyunov

Russian computer scientists
Russian mathematicians
Living people
Academic staff of Moscow State University
1953 births
Moscow State University alumni